Audrey Maple (born Elsie H. Schroeder; 1899 – April 18, 1971) was an American actress, singer, and vaudeville performer.

Early life
Audrey Maple was born Elsie H. Schroeder in Trenton, New Jersey. Her father was a musician.

Career

Audrey Maple performed in vaudeville in a novelty act called Pianophiends. In the operetta The Love Waltz (1908-1909), she was half of a highly publicized "eight-minute kiss" during a dance scene.

She appeared in Broadway productions, mostly musical comedies, including The Arcadians (1910), The Firefly (1912-1913), Molly O (1916), Katinka (1916), Good Night, Paul (1917), Her Regiment by Victor Herbert (1917), Monte Cristo Jr. (1919), Tangerine (1921-1922), Princess April (1924), Naughty Riquette (1926), My Princess (1927), Sunny Days (1928), Angela (1928-1929), and The Street Singer (1929-1930).

Maple appeared in two films, The Plumbers are Coming (1929) and Enlighten Thy Daughter (1934).

Personal life
Maple's personal life involved enough gossip, scandal, and legal entanglements to prompt commentary in newspapers: "What again! It's perfectly terrible the way wives pick on poor little Audrey Maple, the pretty musical comedy star, and try to make out that she is a naughty girl." In 1928 she survived a car accident in Chicago that killed one of her co-stars, dancer Rosalie Claire.

In 1940, Audrey Maple married engineer and inventor Ernest A. Zadig, and retired from the stage. She died in New York in 1971, aged 72 years.

References

External links
 
 
 A photograph of Audrey Maple in the Billy Rose Theatre Collection Photograph File, New York Public Library Digital Collections.

1899 births
1971 deaths
American actresses
Vaudeville performers
People from Trenton, New Jersey
20th-century American women
20th-century American people